Vittorio Gottardi (born 18 March 1967) is a Swiss former footballer who played in the late 1980s and early 1990s. He played mainly as a forward, but also as a midfielder. 

Gottardi first played for SC Dornach in the fourth tier of Swiss football. He joined FC Basel's first team for their 1989–90 season and signed his first professional contract under head coach Urs Siegenthaler in the second tier of Swiss football. After playing in three test games, Gottardi played his domestic league debut for his new club in the home game in the St. Jakob Stadium on 9 September 1989 as Basel won 2–0 against Grenchen. Gottardi scored his first goal for his club in the home game on 28 July 1990. But it was not enough to save the team, as Basel were defeated 1–2 by Locarno.

Gottardi stayed with the club for three seasons and was a regular starter in the team. During his time with the club Gottardi played 123 games scoring four goals; 83 games were in the Nationalliga A, five in the Swiss Cup and 35 were friendly games. He scored two goals in the domestic league, the other two were scored during the test games.

Following his time with Basel, Gottardi returned to his club of origin.

References

Sources
 Die ersten 125 Jahre. Publisher: Josef Zindel im Friedrich Reinhardt Verlag, Basel. 
 Verein "Basler Fussballarchiv" Homepage

SC Dornach players
FC Basel players
Swiss men's footballers
Association football midfielders
Association football forwards
1967 births
Living people
Swiss Challenge League players